Aleksandar Komadina (born 8 November 1975) is a Serbian former football defender.

After initially playing with his hometown clubs Radnički Niš and Železničar Niš, Komadina went on to play abroad, firstly in Moldova with Zimbru Chișinău and later in Russia with Kuban Krasnodar, Torpedo-Metallurg and Khimki. He also played with Zhenis Astana in Kazakhstan, before returning to his homeland in 2007. In the following five years, Komadina played with Jagodina, Smederevo and Sinđelić Niš.

External links
 

1975 births
Living people
Sportspeople from Niš
Serbian footballers
Association football defenders
FK Radnički Niš players
FC Zimbru Chișinău players
Expatriate footballers in Moldova
FC Kuban Krasnodar players
Expatriate footballers in Russia
FC Moscow players
Russian Premier League players
FC Khimki players
Expatriate footballers in Kazakhstan
FK Jagodina players
FK Smederevo players
FK Sinđelić Niš players
Serbian SuperLiga players
Serbia and Montenegro expatriate footballers
Serbia and Montenegro footballers
FC Zhenis Astana players